Clairvoyance is the magical ability to gain information about an object, person, location, or physical event through extrasensory perception. Any person who is claimed to have such ability is said to be a clairvoyant ("one who sees clearly").

Claims for the existence of paranormal and psychic abilities such as clairvoyance have not been supported by scientific evidence. Parapsychology explores this possibility, but the existence of the paranormal is not accepted by the scientific community. The scientific community widely considers parapsychology, including the study of clairvoyance, a pseudoscience.

Usage
Pertaining to the ability of clear-sightedness, clairvoyance refers to the paranormal ability to see persons and events that are distant in time or space.  It can be divided into roughly three classes: precognition, the ability to perceive or predict future events, retrocognition, the ability to see past events, and remote viewing, the perception of contemporary events happening outside the range of normal perception.

In history and religion
Throughout history, there have been numerous places and times in which people have claimed themselves or others to be clairvoyant.

In several religions, stories of certain individuals being able to see things far removed from their immediate sensory perception are commonplace, especially within pagan religions where oracles were used. Prophecy often involved some degree of clairvoyance, especially when future events were predicted. This ability has sometimes been attributed to a higher power rather than to the person performing it.

Christianity
A number of Christian saints were said to be able to see or know things that were far removed from their immediate sensory perception as a kind of gift from God, including Columba of Iona, Padre Pio and Anne Catherine Emmerich. Jesus Christ in the Gospels is also recorded as being able to know things that were far removed from his immediate human perception. Some Christians today also share the same claim.

Jainism

In Jainism, clairvoyance is regarded as one of the five kinds of knowledge. The beings of hell and heaven (devas) are said to possess clairvoyance by birth. According to Jain text Sarvārthasiddhi, "this kind of knowledge has been called avadhi as it ascertains matter in downward range or knows objects within limits".

Anthroposophy
Rudolf Steiner, famous as a clairvoyant himself, claimed that for a clairvoyant, it is easy to confuse his own emotional and spiritual being with the objective spiritual world.

Parapsychology

Early research
The earliest record of somnambulist clairvoyance is credited to the Marquis de Puységur, a follower of Franz Mesmer, who in 1784 was treating a local dull-witted peasant named Victor Race. During treatment, Race reportedly would go into trance and undergo a personality change, becoming fluent and articulate, and giving diagnosis and prescription for his own disease as well as those of others. Clairvoyance was a reported ability of some mediums during the spiritualist period of the late 19th and early 20th centuries, and psychics of many descriptions have claimed clairvoyant ability up to the present day.

Early researchers of clairvoyance included William Gregory, Gustav Pagenstecher, and Rudolf Tischner. Clairvoyance experiments were reported in 1884 by Charles Richet. Playing cards were enclosed in envelopes and a subject put under hypnosis attempted to identify them. The subject was reported to have been successful in a series of 133 trials but the results dropped to chance level when performed before a group of scientists in Cambridge. J. M. Peirce and E. C. Pickering reported a similar experiment in which they tested 36 subjects over 23,384 trials which did not obtain above chance scores.

Ivor Lloyd Tuckett (1911) and Joseph McCabe (1920) analyzed early cases of clairvoyance and came to the conclusion they were best explained by coincidence or fraud. In 1919, the magician P. T. Selbit staged a séance at his own flat in Bloomsbury. The spiritualist Arthur Conan Doyle attended the séance and declared the clairvoyance manifestations to be genuine.

A significant development in clairvoyance research came when J. B. Rhine, a parapsychologist at Duke University, introduced a standard methodology, with a standard statistical approach to analyzing data, as part of his research into extrasensory perception. A number of psychological departments attempted to repeat Rhine's experiments, with failure. W. S. Cox (1936) from Princeton University with 132 subjects produced 25,064 trials in a playing card ESP experiment. Cox concluded, "There is no evidence of extrasensory perception either in the 'average man' or of the group investigated or in any particular individual of that group. The discrepancy between these results and those obtained by Rhine is due either to uncontrollable factors in experimental procedure or to the difference in the subjects." Four other psychological departments failed to replicate Rhine's results. It was revealed that Rhine's experiments contained methodological flaws and procedural errors.

Eileen Garrett was tested by Rhine at Duke University in 1933 with Zener cards. Certain symbols that were placed on the cards and sealed in an envelope, and she was asked to guess their contents. She performed poorly and later criticized the tests by claiming the cards lacked a psychic energy called "energy stimulus" and that she could not perform clairvoyance to order. The parapsychologist Samuel Soal and his colleagues tested Garrett in May 1937. Most of the experiments were carried out in the Psychological Laboratory at the University College London. A total of over 12,000 guesses were recorded but Garrett failed to produce above chance level. In his report Soal wrote "In the case of Mrs. Eileen Garrett we fail to find the slightest confirmation of Dr. J. B. Rhine's remarkable claims relating to her alleged powers of extra-sensory perception. Not only did she fail when I took charge of the experiments, but she failed equally when four other carefully trained experimenters took my place."

Remote viewing

Remote viewing, also known as remote sensing, remote perception, telesthesia and travelling clairvoyance is the alleged paranormal ability to perceive a remote or hidden target without support of the senses.

A well known study of remote viewing in recent times has been the US government-funded project at the Stanford Research Institute during the 1970s through the mid-1990s. In 1972, Harold Puthoff and Russell Targ initiated a series of human subject studies to determine whether participants (the viewers or percipients) could reliably identify and accurately describe salient features of remote locations or targets. In the early studies, a human sender was typically present at the remote location, as part of the experiment protocol. A three-step process was used, the first step being to randomly select the target conditions to be experienced by the senders. Secondly, in the viewing step, participants were asked to verbally express or sketch their impressions of the remote scene. Thirdly, in the judging step, these descriptions were matched by separate judges, as closely as possible, with the intended targets. The term remote viewing was coined to describe this overall process. The first paper by Puthoff and Targ on remote viewing was published in Nature in March 1974; in it, the team reported some degree of remote viewing success. After the publication of these findings, other attempts to replicate the experiments were carried out  with remotely linked groups using computer conferencing.

The psychologists David Marks and Richard Kammann attempted to replicate Targ and Puthoff's remote viewing experiments that were carried out in the 1970s at the Stanford Research Institute. In a series of 35 studies, they were unable to replicate the results so investigated the procedure of the original experiments. Marks and Kammann discovered that the notes given to the judges in Targ and Puthoff's experiments contained clues as to which order they were carried out, such as referring to yesterday's two targets, or they had the date of the session written at the top of the page. They concluded that these clues were the reason for the experiment's high hit rates. Marks was able to achieve 100 per cent accuracy without visiting any of the sites himself but by using cues. James Randi has written controlled tests by several other researchers, eliminating several sources of cuing and extraneous evidence present in the original tests, produced negative results. Students were also able to solve Puthoff and Targ's locations from the clues that had inadvertently been included in the transcripts.

In 1980, Charles Tart claimed that a rejudging of the transcripts from one of Targ and Puthoff's experiments revealed an above-chance result. Targ and Puthoff again refused to provide copies of the transcripts and it was not until July 1985 that they were made available for study when it was discovered they still contained sensory cues. Marks and Christopher Scott (1986) wrote "considering the importance for the remote viewing hypothesis of adequate cue removal, Tart's failure to perform this basic task seems beyond comprehension. As previously concluded, remote viewing has not been demonstrated in the experiments conducted by Puthoff and Targ, only the repeated failure of the investigators to remove sensory cues."

In 1982 Robert Jahn, then Dean of the School of Engineering at Princeton University wrote a comprehensive review of psychic phenomena from an engineering perspective. His paper included numerous references to remote viewing studies at the time. Statistical flaws in his work have been proposed by others in the parapsychological community and within the general scientific community.

Scientific reception

According to scientific research, clairvoyance is generally explained as the result of confirmation bias, expectancy bias, fraud, hallucination, self-delusion, sensory leakage, subjective validation, wishful thinking or failures to appreciate the base rate of chance occurrences and not as a paranormal power. Parapsychology is generally regarded by the scientific community as a pseudoscience. In 1988, the US National Research Council concluded "The committee finds no scientific justification from research conducted over a period of 130 years, for the existence of parapsychological phenomena."

Skeptics say that if clairvoyance were a reality, it would have become abundantly clear. They also contend that those who believe in paranormal phenomena do so for merely psychological reasons. According to David G. Myers (Psychology, 8th ed.):

The search for a valid and reliable test of clairvoyance has resulted in thousands of experiments. One controlled procedure has invited 'senders' to telepathically transmit one of four visual images to 'receivers' deprived of sensation in a nearby chamber (Bem & Honorton, 1994). The result? A reported 32 percent accurate response rate, surpassing the chance rate of 25 percent. But follow-up studies have (depending on who was summarizing the results) failed to replicate the phenomenon or produced mixed results (Bem & others, 2001; Milton & Wiseman, 2002; Storm, 2000, 2003).One skeptic, magician James Randi, had a longstanding offer of U.S. $1 million—"to anyone who proves a genuine psychic power under proper observing conditions" (Randi, 1999). French, Australian, and Indian groups have parallel offers of up to 200,000 euros to anyone with demonstrable paranormal abilities (CFI, 2003). Large as these sums are, the scientific seal of approval would be worth far more to anyone whose claims could be authenticated. To refute those who say there is no ESP, one need only produce a single person who can demonstrate a single, reproducible ESP phenomenon. So far, no such person has emerged. Randi's offer has been publicized for three decades and dozens of people have been tested, sometimes under the scrutiny of an independent panel of judges. Still, nothing.  "People's desire to believe in the paranormal is stronger than all the evidence that it does not exist." Susan Blackmore, "Blackmore's first law", 2004.

Clairvoyance is considered a hallucination by mainstream psychiatry.

See also

 Astral projection
 Aura
 Clairvoyance (book)
 Inner eye
 List of topics characterized as pseudoscience
 Out-of-body experience
 Mediumship
 Photoacoustic effect
 Postdiction (retroactive clairvoyance)
 Precognition
 Remote viewing
 Second sight
 Scientific skepticism
 Synchronicity
 Thought-Forms (book)

References

Bibliography 
 Alt URL

Further reading

 James Alcock (1981). Parapsychology: Science or Magic? A Psychological Perspective. Pergamon Press. .
 Willis Dutcher (1922). [https://archive.org/stream/onothersideoffoo00dutcrich#page/n3/mode/2up On the Other Side of the Footlights: An Expose of Routines, Apparatus and Deceptions Resorted to by Mediums, Clairvoyants, Fortune Tellers and Crystal Gazers in Deluding the Public]. Berlin, WI: Heaney Magic.
 Thomas Gilovich (1993). How We Know What Isn't So: Fallibility of Human Reason in Everyday Life. Free Press. .
 Henry Gordon (1988). Extrasensory Deception: ESP, Psychics, Shirley MacLaine, Ghosts, UFOs. Macmillan of Canada. . 
Donald Hebb (1980). Extrasensory Perception: A Problem. In Essays on Mind. Lawrence Erlbaum Associates. .
 C. E. M. Hansel (1989). The Search for Psychic Power: ESP and Parapsychology Revisited. Prometheus Books. . 
 Terence Hines (2003). Pseudoscience and the Paranormal. Prometheus Books. .
 David Marks. (2000). The Psychology of the Psychic (2nd Edition). Prometheus Books. .
 Joseph McCabe (1920). Is Spiritualism Based On Fraud? The Evidence Given By Sir A. C. Doyle and Others Drastically Examined. Chapter "The Subtle Art of Clairvoyance". London: Watts & Co. pp. 93–108.

External links

 Springer Psychic: "A Study in 'Clairvoyance' – Joe Nickell
 "Debunking the Sixth Sense" – Science Daily
 "Clairvoyance" – The Skeptic's Dictionary

New Age practices
Paranormal terminology
Parapsychology
Pseudoscience
Psychic powers
Telepathy
!

de:Hellsehen